Oya is a town and the administrative centre of the subdistrict of the same name in Mukah Division, in the Malaysian state of Sarawak. It is located near the mouth of Oya River with the South China Sea.

Oya has a secondary school, namely Oya National Secondary School. It also has primary schools: Datu Pengiran Mohamad National School, Yak Tee (Chinese) National-Type School, KG Senau National School, Kampung Bakong Terus National School, KPG Teh National School.

Towns in Sarawak